Schloss Marquardt is a palace located 15 km northwest from downtown Potsdam, in the neighbourhood Marquardt. The palace has been used for different purposes, such as summer or winter residence of nobility and upper-class people, hotel, hospital, and university. Currently the building is used for events, such as weddings and gastronomy, and also as a filming location (notably for Spencer and The Book Thief).

References

External links

Palaces in Germany
Castles in Brandenburg
Heritage sites in Brandenburg
Buildings and structures in Potsdam
Manor houses in Germany
Parks in Germany